Wallangra is a village in New South Wales, Australia.

References 

Towns in New South Wales
Inverell Shire